Resurrection Letters, Volume Two (represented as Volume II on the album cover) is the tenth studio album by the American singer-songwriter Andrew Peterson, released in 2008.

Background
Peterson alongside Centricity Music released the album on October 21, 2008. He worked with Andy Gullahorn and Ben Shive, in the production of this album.

Critical reception

Awarding the album four and a half stars at Christianity Today, Russ Breimeier states, the album "proves Peterson to be consistently excellent." Jennifer E. Jones, rating the album four spins from Christian Broadcasting Network, writes, "Fans of his powerful storytelling through song will sink into the incredible depth of Resurrection Letters." Rating the album a four and a half out of five by The Phantom Tollbooth, Michael Dalton says, the release "is Andrew being his usual creative self." Laura Nunnery, signaling in a four-and-a-half-star review for Jesus Freak Hideout, says that he is underappreciated and that "he is never miserly when it comes to producing quality albums that are honest, poignant, and relatable." Indicating in a four-star review at Christian Music Planet, Andrew Greer describes, "Andrew Peterson ignites the fire of God in 11 songs filled with transparent lyrics and evocative melodies." Jonathan Bellamy, cautioning in a seven out of ten review from Cross Rhythms, replies, "His longevity says something about the quality of his artistry, although the lack of significant awareness perhaps indicates an artist yet to find that impacting song that will raise him to wider appeal." Worship Leader reviewed the album, where they say "Peterson is biblically expansive and catchy. That's right; he proves the two qualities are not mutually exclusive."

Track listing

Chart performance

References

Sources

2008 albums
Andrew Peterson (musician) albums